The Rouyn-Noranda Synagogue is a synagogue located in the city of Rouyn-Noranda, Quebec, Canada. It was built in 1948 as the Beit Knesset Israel in Hebrew or Kneseth Israel Congregation in English by the Rouyn-Noranda Hebrew Congregation. A first wooden synagogue was built in 1932 before the same place. It was closed as a place of Jewish worship in 1972.

History of the Jews in Rouyn-Noranda 
The first Jew to live in Rouyn-Noranda was Louis Scott, who stood on the edge of Osisko Lake. However, Mr. and Mrs. D. Caplan are actually the first to be cited at the opening of the second synagogue in 1949.

See also 

 History of the Jews in Canada

References

External links 
 Vue général de la ville de Noranda en 1937 avec, en arrière-plan, la Mine Noranda. On y voit la synagogue. Cliquez sur Voir les image(s):1.
 Étude d’ensemble et inventaire du patrimoine bâti de Rouyn-Noranda
 La vie religieuse dans les paroisses rurales et minières de l’Abitibi 
  Histoire de la communauté juive du Québec
  Corporation gérant les deux sites historiques de Rouyn-Noranda dont l'église orthodoxe russe et son centre d'interprétation sur l'histoire des immigrants

Synagogues in Quebec
Buildings and structures in Abitibi-Témiscamingue
Rouyn-Noranda